Alex McGregor may refer to:

 Alex McGregor (actress), South African actress
 Alex McGregor (footballer, born 1896), Scottish football player (Dumbarton, Celtic)
 Alex McGregor (footballer, born 1950), Scottish football player (Ayr United, Shrewsbury Town, Aldershot)
 Alex McGregor (Australian footballer) (1908–1997), Australian rules footballer for Geelong
 Alex McGregor (Cook Island footballer) (born 1987), New Zealand-born footballer with heritage from the Cook Islands
 Alex McGregor (politician) (fl. 2000), Canadian politician, Progressive Conservative Party candidate in Sudbury